Santiago Ignacio López (born 19 April 1989) is an Argentine professional footballer who plays as a left-back for Berazategui.

Career
López's first club was 9 de Julio in 2007, who he played twenty-two times for in two seasons in Torneo Argentino B. Tristán Suárez signed López in 2010, he stayed with the club for one season, 2010–11 Primera B Metropolitana, and featured in twenty-seven fixtures. López had a spell with Justo José de Urquiza between 2011 and 2012, prior to signing for Deportivo Español ahead of the 2012–13 Primera C Metropolitana campaign. In his second season, 2013–14, Deportivo Español were promoted to Primera B Metropolitana. He scored his first professional goal in their 2014 opener versus Chacarita Juniors.

He departed Deportivo Español in December 2015, following three goals in one hundred and twenty-seven appearances in three years. During his time with the club, López was loaned out to Altos Hornos Zapla of Torneo Argentino B in 2013. January 2016 saw López join Primera B Metropolitana's Estudiantes. Forty-two appearances followed in the 2016 and 2016–17 seasons. On 22 August 2017, López completed a move to Primera B Nacional side Deportivo Riestra. However, he didn't play any games for the Blanquinegros during the season. Argentino de Quilmes signed López in 2018. In the summer 2019, López joined Deportivo Laferrere.

Career statistics
.

References

External links

1989 births
Living people
People from Berazategui Partido
Argentine footballers
Association football defenders
Torneo Argentino B players
Primera B Metropolitana players
Primera C Metropolitana players
Primera Nacional players
9 de Julio de Río Tercero players
CSyD Tristán Suárez footballers
Asociación Social y Deportiva Justo José de Urquiza players
Deportivo Español footballers
Altos Hornos Zapla players
Estudiantes de Buenos Aires footballers
Deportivo Riestra players
Argentino de Quilmes players
Deportivo Laferrere footballers
A.D. Berazategui footballers
Sportspeople from Buenos Aires Province